The New Zealand flathead, Bembrops morelandi, is a duckbill fish of the family Percophidae, subfamily Bembropinae, found only around New Zealand, at depths between 365 and 395 m. Their length is up to 20 cm.

Etymology
The flathead is named in honor of John “Jock” Munne Moreland (1921-2012), who was the Curator of Ichthyology and Herpetology at the National Museum of New Zealand, because of his contribution to the study of the fishes of New Zealand.

References

 
 Tony Ayling & Geoffrey Cox, Collins Guide to the Sea Fishes of New Zealand, (William Collins Publishers Ltd, Auckland, New Zealand 1982) 

Percophidae
Endemic marine fish of New Zealand
Taxa named by Joseph S. Nelson
Fish described in 1978